Sreten Jocić (born 24 October 1962), also known as Joca Amsterdam, is a Serbian gangster from Velika Krsna who operated in the Netherlands. He was sentenced to 15 years' imprisonment for the murder of Goran Marjanović in July 1995, and is serving his sentence in a Zabela prison in Požarevac, Serbia.

In April 2016 Jocić sought damages against the state of Serbia for unlawful detainment in another murder investigation, the death of Croatian journalist Ivo Pukanić, for 60 million dinars (approximately €500,000). His trial in that case has already cost the state 11 million dinars in legal fees.

References

External links
 "Killing the Journalist or: Sreten Jocic alias Joca Amsterdam – The bloody journey of a Mafia boss across Europe", oraclesyndicate.twoday.net; accessed 2 August 2016.
 Profile, kurir-info.rs; accessed 20 January 2016.

Living people
People from Smederevska Palanka
Gangsters from Belgrade
1962 births